Yelü Pusuwan (died 1177) was regent of the Western Liao dynasty (Qara Lhitai) during the minority of her nephew Yelü Zhilugu from 1163 to 1177. She was the younger sister of the Western Liao emperor Yelü Yilie (Emperor Renzong).

Reign 
She stepped up as regent when her older brother Yelü Yilie died, since his son Yelü Zhilugu was still a minor.

In 1165 Masud II pillaged Balkh and Andkhoy with Pusuwan's support. After punitive expeditions in 1169 and 1172, Qara Khitai army crushed Il-Arslan, who soon died. His death caused civil war in Khwarazmid realm — his wife Terken Khatun enthroned Sultan Shah, while another son Tekish fled to Qara Khitai and asked for help.  Around this time Mu'ayyid al-Din Ai-Aba sent a tribute to empress.

Yelü Pusuwan sent her husband Xiao Duolubu (蕭朵魯不) with a huge army who defeated Sultan Shah, and put Tekish to throne on 11 December 1172.

In eastern border, she tried subdue Naimans and Qanglis unsuccessfully by sending her general Erbuz (額兒布思).

After a while Tekish fed up with growing Qara Khitai demands of tribute and killed an emissary sent by Pusuwan, who was her relative. This caused Pusuwan to favor Sultan Shah. Xiao Duolubu was sent again, this time to dethrone the very man he had crowned.

While Duolubu was away, she was infatuated with his brother Xiao Puguzhi (蕭樸古只). She created Duolubu as "Pacifier of East" (東平王) but spent more time lately with her new lover. When her father-in-law Xiao Wolila (蕭斡里剌) found about the relationship, he surrounded the palace and killed both lovers.

Her nephew Yelü Zhilugu was installed as new emperor.

References 

|-

1177 deaths
Emperors of Qara Khitai
Yelü clan
12th-century viceregal rulers
12th-century women rulers
Chinese princesses
12th-century Khitan women